Gare d'Hyères is a railway station serving the town Hyères, Var department, southeastern France. The station is served by regional trains (TER Provence-Alpes-Côte d'Azur) to Marseille and Toulon.

References

Railway stations in Var
Railway stations in France opened in 1875